Adolphe Schmit (born 17 August 1940), known as Ady Schmit, is a Luxembourgish former footballer. Schmit played most of his career in France. He scored three of his six goals for the Luxembourg national team on 8 October 1961 during a 4–2 win in a World Cup qualifying match versus Portugal, where Eusébio debuted in the national side.

References

Profile at playerhistory

External links
 
 

1940 births
Living people
Sportspeople from Luxembourg City
Association football midfielders
Luxembourgian footballers
Luxembourg international footballers
Luxembourgian expatriate footballers
CS Fola Esch players
FC Sochaux-Montbéliard players
FC Mulhouse players
SAS Épinal players
Ligue 1 players
Ligue 2 players
Expatriate footballers in France
Luxembourgian football managers
Luxembourgian expatriate sportspeople in France
Luxembourgian expatriate football managers
SAS Épinal managers
Association football player-managers